The Scroll of Taiwu is a role-playing game known for its popularity as a Chinese indie game. It was released in early access on September 20, 2018, by Kunming-based studio ConchShip Games with no English translation. The game is based on Wuxia and Chinese mythology. The game was a bestseller on the distribution platform Steam and a bellwether for a burgeoning Chinese indie game scene. In September 2018, the game ranked second in Steam's global sales charts, ahead of many popular Western games. It was seen as a harbinger of China's potential influence on the platform, which had not been formally opened to the region. In April 2022, ConchShip Games announced that "The Scroll of Taiwu" official version would be released on September 21, 2022. In September 2022, ConchShip Studio announced on social media that a new version of "The Scroll of Taiwu" would be updated on September 21 at 23:00.

Gameplay 
The Scroll of Taiwu is a role-playing game set in the vast and immersive "Taiwu" Universe. Players take on the role of a "successor of Taiwu," where they must navigate a world filled with choices and consequences. Whether they choose to be virtuous or malicious, their actions will shape the outcome of their journey.

As players explore the world, they will encounter various sects and gangs, each with their unique martial art styles to learn. Players can form bonds of brotherhood or become sworn enemies with other characters, establish their village, run a variety of businesses, or even settle down with a partner and start a family.

However, players must ultimately face off against the greatest enemy of the "Taiwu" family and determine the fate of the world. It is up to the player to utilize their skills and make decisions that will test their morals and decision-making abilities.

The Scroll of Taiwu promises to take players on an epic adventure that will challenge them in ways they never thought possible. Get ready to step into the shoes of a "successor of Taiwu" and embark on a journey that will leave a lasting impression.

References

Further reading

External links 

 

2018 video games
Role-playing video games
Video games developed in China
Indie video games
Single-player video games
Video games based on Chinese mythology
Windows games
Windows-only games